San Lorenzo (or: Villa San Lorenzo) is a town in the Tarija Department in Bolivia.

Location

Population
San Lorenzo had a population of 2,340 inhabitants according to the 1992 (census), 2,754 inhabitants according to the 2001 census, and was predicted to have more than 3,000 inhabitants by 2007.

San Lorenzo was the home of Eustaquio Méndez, one of the leaders in the fights for the Argentina independence. The local museum Casa del Moto Méndez exhibits some of his personal belongings and weapons.

External links
Map of the province

Populated places in Tarija Department